George Shannon may refer to:
George Shannon (actor), professor of gerontology
George Shannon (explorer) (1785–1836), member of the Lewis and Clark Expedition
George R. Shannon (1818–1891), member of the Texas Senate